Hamilton Catholic High School opened up in 1909 on Dayton Street in Hamilton, Ohio. The school originally served the young Catholic men of the area. The school closed in 1966, and its students were moved to the newly opened Father Stephen T. Badin High School. The former Hamilton Catholic High School building currently serves as the Hamilton Board of Education Office.

Notable alumni
 Jim Holstein, former pro basketball player, head coach at Ball State University
 Kent Tekulve, former MLB pitcher (Pittsburgh Pirates, Philadelphia Phillies, Cincinnati Reds)
Navy Veteran Earl A. Rust Jr,

See also
Notre Dame High School

References

External links
Badin High School
Hamilton Catholic High School, 1909–1966 – articles about Hamilton Catholic from the Butler County Historical Society

Buildings and structures in Hamilton, Ohio
Defunct Catholic secondary schools in Ohio
School buildings on the National Register of Historic Places in Ohio
National Register of Historic Places in Butler County, Ohio
Educational institutions established in 1909
Educational institutions disestablished in 1966
1909 establishments in Ohio
1966 disestablishments in Ohio